Kandiah Kamalesvaran  (born 13 November 1934), better known by his stage name Kamahl, is a Malaysian-born Australian singer and recording artist. His highest charting Australian single, "Sounds of Goodbye" (1969), reached the top 20 on the Kent Music Report singles chart. Another single, "The Elephant Song" (1975), peaked at number one in both the Netherlands and Belgium. Generally, his repertoire comprises pop and adult contemporary music.

Early life
Kamahl was born in Kuala Lumpur to Ceylonese Tamil and Malaysian Indian Hindu parents, the second eldest of six children, in Brickfields, Kuala Lumpur. His father was head of the local Tamil music school. Kamahl studied at the Victoria Institution. He arrived in Adelaide, South Australia, in April 1953, to receive a higher education at King's College (later renamed Pembroke School).

Music career
At his early public performances, from 1958, he shortened his name to Kamal, but successive masters of ceremonies announced him as "camel"; so he changed its spelling to Kamahl. Rupert Murdoch was an early important sponsor and tipped Kamahl £10 at an Adelaide concert in December 1958 and encouraged him to move to Sydney. Without asking, Murdoch arranged for Kamahl to perform a six-week season at the Australia Hotel in Sydney. After that season, he boarded with the Murdochs for two years. Kamahl was a finalist in the Sydney Eisteddfod Sun Aria in 1966 singing Verdi's "Ella giammai m'amò" and Mussorgsky's "Farewell and Death of Boris".

Kamahl co-wrote and sang the theme song for a feature film, Journey Out of Darkness, made through the services of Supreme Sound Studios in Paddington, Sydney, and filmed in Orange, New South Wales. He also appeared in the film, acting as an Aboriginal Australian.

He has performed at the London Palladium and Carnegie Hall as well as pubs and clubs throughout Australia.

His first album, A Voice to Remember, was released in Australia in October 1967. He released singles and albums in the United States, Canada, Britain, New Zealand, South America, India, Singapore, Malaysia and Germany (in German), as well as in the Netherlands, Belgium and Scandinavia. From 1967 onwards in Australia, his records, tapes and CDs were primarily on the Philips label, but he also recorded on EMI, Mercury, Festival, Dino and Reader's Digest.

In 1975, his single, "The Elephant Song", (composed and produced by Hans van Hemert) reached number one on the Dutch Top 40, the Nationale Hitparade (currently Single Top 100) and the Belgian BRT Top 30. This song was part of the soundtrack of a World Wildlife Fund TV documentary. In 1978, Billboard reported "The Elephant Song" was the biggest selling single ever in Sweden.

He has been in the Australian music industry over for fifty years and during that time has made some memorable TV and film appearances, as well as concerts. He was one of the first people to appear in concert at the Sydney Opera House. He was a particularly popular guest on the variety show Hey Hey It's Saturday. In 2004, he appeared at the Big Day Out rock festival, and the year before he had cameos in the Australian films Harvie Krumpet and Fat Pizza.

In 2005, he has made appearances as a judge on The X-Factor and has a sponsorship deal with Coca-Cola. On 19 September 2007, he appeared on The Chaser's War on Everything on ABC TV where he sang for a "newly-wed couple" who turned up uninvited at his door.

In early 2008, Kamahl reunited with his old school, Pembroke (then Kings College), and went on tour in the United States with the Pembroke Symphony Orchestra.

In recent years, Kamahl has released albums through ABC Music. A compilation Christmas album entitled Peace On Earth, and a three-CD collection of favourites entitled Heart and Soul: For Lovers Of Life.

Television appearances

In 1988, Kamahl appeared in a television commercial for Dilmah tea. In 2007, he made commercials for the Australian cable channel Fox8, advertising its WWE programming.

In 2009, he criticised the Australian TV show Hey Hey It's Saturday for its treatment of him during his appearances. His feelings were revealed to the Australian public shortly after Harry Connick, Jr. complained of a "black faces" skit for the show's "Red Faces" segment. In April 2021, the former compere Daryl Somers wrote a lengthy apology to Kamahl and to those who found the show's content offensive.

Kamahl appeared in an episode of the Australian TV quiz show Spicks and Specks, first broadcast on 8 September 2010.

In 2012, Kamahl made appearances in Prime's show The Unbelievable Truth. In May 2013, an Australian drama, Offspring, broadcast an episode which had Kamahl in a minor role as a medical specialist.

Personal life 
In 1967, Kamahl married an Indo-Fijian woman, Sahodra, of whom his family did not approve. "There was no way my parents would've given their blessing." They have two children, Rajan (born c. 1969) and Rani (born c. 1971). Rani had a brief singing career which reached its peak in the late 1990s.

In November 2021, Kamahl revealed that he and Sahodra had separated after 55 years of marriage.

Discography
In 1985, the Chicago Tribune reported Kamahl as having sold "more than 20 million records worldwide" and "76 gold and 14 platinum records". In a 2007 press release, Kamahl's records were said to have achieved gold and platinum status over 80 times. In 2018, Port News reported Kamahl as having recorded more than 30 albums and earned "more than 100 gold and platinum records".

Studio albums

Live albums

Charting compilation albums

Charting singles

Notes

Awards and recognition
 1994 – Member of the Order of Australia
 1998 – Australian Father of the Year award
 2004 – Australian Centenary Medal

In May 2006, he received another Australian honour when he was included in "Our Entertainers of the 20th Century". The award was organised by the Variety Club of Australia, the top entertainers of the century included Kylie Minogue, Dame Joan Sutherland, Jack Thompson and Graham Kennedy.

Mo Awards
The Australian Entertainment Mo Awards (commonly known informally as the Mo Awards), were annual Australian entertainment industry awards. They recognise achievements in live entertainment in Australia from 1975 to 2016. Kamahl won three awards in that time.
 (wins only)
|-
| 1982
| Kamahl
| Daily Telegraph Readers Award
| 
|-
| 1983
| Kamahl
| Daily Telegraph Readers Award
| 
|-
| 1984
| Kamahl
| Daily Telegraph Readers Award
| 
|-

References

External links

 Kamahl's official website
 Some information about Kamahl about when he was young in Malaysia, from the Victoria Institution
 Kamahl performing "My Home" in 2015 at the age of 80 in Newcastle, NSW, Australia

Australian male singers
1934 births
Living people
Musicians from Adelaide
Members of the Order of Australia
Recipients of the Centenary Medal
Tamil musicians
Australian people of Sri Lankan Tamil descent
Australian Hindus
Australian pop singers
Malaysian people of Indian descent
Malaysian Hindus
Sri Lankan Tamil musicians
Malaysian people of Sri Lankan Tamil descent
People educated at Pembroke School, Adelaide
Attic Records (Canada) artists
Philips Records artists
Malaysian emigrants to Australia
Australian baritones
People from Kuala Lumpur